The list of Kriegsmarine ships includes all ships commissioned into the Kriegsmarine, the navy of Nazi Germany, during its existence from 1935 to the conclusion of World War II in 1945.

See the list of naval ships of Germany for ships in German service throughout the country's history.

Capital ships

Pre-dreadnought battleships

Modern battleships

Cruisers

Heavy cruisers

Light cruisers

Destroyers and torpedo boats

Named destroyers

Numbered destroyers

Torpedo boats

 Torpedoboot 1923 ("Raubvogel") (900 tons, 3 × 105 mm guns)
 
 
 
 
 
 
 Torpedoboot 1924 ("Raubtier") (950 tons, 3 × 105 mm guns)
 
 
 
 
 
 
 Torpedoboot 1935 (1,090 tons, 1 × 105 mm gun)
  through 
 Torpedoboot 1937 (1,150 tons, 1 × 105 mm gun)
  through 
 Flottentorpedoboot 1939 (Elbing) (1,750 tons, 4 × 105 mm guns)
  through

Auxiliary cruisers

Mine warfare craft

Minelayers
  1935 (5,500 tons, 3 × 150mm guns, 460 mines)
  1936 (3,900 tons, 3 × 105mm guns, 250 mines)
  1941 (2,000 tons, 2 × 88mm guns, 200 mines)
  1934 (1,800 tons, 2 × 105mm guns, 260 mines)
  1939 (2,431 tons, 2 × 88mm guns, 360 mines)
  1942 (3,152 tons, 4  x 20mm guns, 80 mines)
  1924 (1,800 tons, 2 × 88mm guns, 120 mines)
  1940 (3 × 10.5 cm guns, 2 × 3.7 cm anti-aircraft guns, 10 × 2 cm anti-aircraft guns, 4 × 46 cm torpedo tubes, 280 mines)
  1934 (1,200 tons, 2 × 88mm guns, 145 mines)
  1939 (370 tons, 2 × 88mm guns, 100 mines)
  1939 (370 tons, 2 × 88mm guns, 100 mines)
  1943

Sperrbrecher

 Sperrbrecher 1 – Sperrbrecher 100 (5,000 tons, 2 × 88mm guns)

Minesweeper

 M1935 class (875 tons, 2 × 105mm guns)
 M1 – M69
 M1940 class (775 tons, 1 × 105mm gun)
 M70 – M196
 M1943 class (825 tons, 2 × 105mm guns)
 M197 – M214

R Boats

 R1 class 1929 (60 tons, 1 × 37mm gun, 6 mines)
 R1 – R16
 R17 class 1934 (115 tons, 1 × 37mm gun, 12 mines)
 R17 – R24
 R25 class 1938 (110 tons, 1 × 37mm gun, 12 mines)
 R25 – R40
 R41 class 1939 (125 tons, 1 × 37mm gun, 12 mines)
 R41 – R129
 R130 class 1940 (150 tons, 1 × 37mm gun, 12 mines)
 R130 – R150
 R151 class 1940 (125 tons, 1 × 37mm gun, 12 mines)
 R151 – R217
 R218 class 1942 (140 tons, 1 × 37mm gun, 16 mines)
 R218 – R300
 R301 class 1942 (160 tons, 1 × 88mm gun, 16 mines, 2 torpedo tubes)
 R301 – R312

Mine hunters
 KM1 – KM36

Small craft

S-boats

 S1 class (50 tons, 1 × 20mm gun, 2 torpedo tubes)
 S1 – S25
 S26 class (75 tons, 1 × 20mm gun, 2 torpedo tubes)
 S26 – S29
 S30 class (80 tons, 1 × 20mm gun, 2 torpedo tubes)
 S30 – S37
 S38 class (80 tons, 1 × 20mm gun, 2 torpedo tubes)
 S38 – S60
 S38b class (90 tons, 2 × 20mm guns, 2 torpedo tubes)
 S61 – S99
 S100 class (100 tons, 1 × 37mm gun, 2 torpedo tubes)
 S100 – S150
 S151 class (100 tons, 1 × 37mm gun, 2 torpedo tubes)
 S151 – S205

U-boats

Training submarines
 Type I
  and

Coastal submarines
 Type IIA
  through 
 Type IIB
  through 
  and 
 Type IIC
  through 
 Type IID
  through 
 Type XVIIB
  through

Ocean-going submarines
 Type VIIA
  through 
 Type VIIB
  through 
  through 
  through 
  through 
 Type VIIC
  through 
  through 
  through 
  through 
  through 
  through 
  through 
  through 
  through 
  through 
  through 
  through 
  through 
  through 
  through 
  through 
  and 
  through 
  through 
  through 
  through 
  and 
  and 
  and 
  through 
 Type VIIC 41
  through 
  through 
  and 
  and 
  through 
  through 
  through 
  through 
  through 
  through 
  through 
 Type IXA
  through 
 Type IXB
  and 
  through 
  through 
 Type IXC
  through 
  through 
  through 
  through 
  through 
 Type IXC 40
  through 
  through 
  through 
  through 
  through 
  through 
  through U-882
 U-885 through 
  through 
 Type IXD
  through 
  through 
  through 
  through 
  through

Minelaying submarines
 Type VIID
  through 
 Type XB
  through

Supply submarines
 Type VIIF
  through 
 Type IXD /42
  and 
 Type XB
  and 
  and 
 Type XIV
  through 
  through

Electric boats
 Type XXI
  through 
  through 
  and 
  through 
  through 
 Type XXIII
  through 
  through 
  through

Midget submarines
 Seehund (17 tons, 2 × torpedoes)
 138 commissioned
 Hecht (Training)
 53 commissioned
 Biber (6.5 tons, 2 × torpedoes)
 324 commissioned
 Molch (11 tons, 2 × torpedoes)
 393 commissioned
 Delphin (Prototype)
 3 commissioned
 Seeteufel (Prototype)
 1 commissioned
 Schwertwal (Prototype)
 1 commissioned

Human torpedoes
 Neger (1 × torpedo)
 200 commissioned
 Marder (3 tons, 1 × torpedo)
 500 commissioned
 Hai (Prototype)
 1 commissioned

Auxiliary ships

Troop ships
 , 1927
 , 1923
 , 1940
 , 1923
 , 1937
 , 1926
 , 1936
 /, 1923

Artillery training ships
  1933 (1,800 tons, 4 × 127mm guns)
  1934 (3,000 tons, 8 × 105mm guns, 480 mines)

Torpedo training ships
 , 1942

Radio-controlled targets
 
 , 1900
 
 , 1898

Sail training ships
 Niobe, 1913
 Gorch Fock, 1933 (Russian training ship Tovarishch)
 Horst Wessel, 1936 (US Coast Guard Ship Eagle)
 Albert Leo Schlageter, 1937 (Portuguese training ship Sagres)

Aviso
 Grille, 1934

Floating anti-aircraft batteries
  ( light cruiser)
  (Gazelle class light cruiser)
  (ex-Dutch  coastal defense ship)
  (ex-Dutch  cruiser)
  (ex-Norwegian  coastal defense ship)
  (ex-Norwegian  coastal defense ship)

Escort
  (700 tons, 2 × 105mm guns)
 F 1 – F 10
  (925 tons, 1 × 105mm gun)
 PA 1 – PA 4

Gunboats
 LS1 – LS12
 The Following Gunboats were generally armed with one 5.9 inch, two 37mm (1×2) and six 20mm (6×1) guns.
 August 400 tons Launched 1936
 Berkelstrom
 Cascade 338 tons Launched 1937
 Globe 314 tons Launched 1937
 Hast I
 Helene 400 tons Launched 1937
 Joost
 Kemphaan 343 tons Launched 1936
 Nijnberg
 Oostzee 336 tons Launched 1936
 Ost 565 tons Launched 1939
 Paraat
 Polaris 322 tons Launched 1936
 Robert Muller 399 tons Launched 1936
 Soemba
 Trompenberg
 West
 West Vlaanderen 346 tons Launched 1927

Blockade runners/Auxiliary minelayers

Weather ships
  (WBS 5)
  (WBS 8)
  (WBS 7 / WBS 14)
  (WBS 2 )
  (WBS 11)
  /  (WBS 1)
  (WBS 11 / WBS 8)
  (WBS 4)
  (WBS 5)
  (WBS 3 / WBS 4)
  WBS 6)
  (WBS 3)
  (WBS 3)
 
  (WBS 9)
  (WBS 10)
  (WBS 6)
  (WBS 5)
  (WBS 7)
  (WBS 10)
  (WBS 10)
  (WBS 12)
  (WBS 1)

Hospital ships

Fleet Tenders 
 Saar
 Hela
 Tsingtau
 Adolf Lüderitz
 Carl Peters
 Otto Wünsche
 Waldemar Kophamel
 Wilhelm Bauer

Patrol boats
Many vessels were requisitioned for use as vorpostenboote during the war.

Icebreakers 

 Castor
 Eisbär
 Eisvogel
 Pollux

Captured foreign warships
A significant number of foreign warships were captured and recommissioned into the Kriegsmarine. 
 , French battleship captured in 1940 while still under construction, but never completed. With Brest, France shipyard and drydock flooded and always under Allied bombers, it could never be completed.
 Faà di Bruno, laid down 1915, captured 1943, commissioned as monitor Biber, surrendered in 1945 and broken up. 
 , laid down 1938, captured 1941 (never completed)
 HNLMS O 8, captured in 1940, taken into service as UD-1 used as training ship to train crews for the German U-boats. Decommissioned in 1943.
 , captured 1940, taken into service as UB
 The Danish training ship/coastal defense ship  was refloated after an attempted destruction of the ship via running aground during Battle of Isefjord, disarmed and used as a training ship renamed Nordland by the Kriegsmarine. Scuttled a second time 3 May 1945, scrapped 1952.
 Four Norwegian s, &  were captured in 1940. All four ships saw service in the Kriegsmarine. 
 Four French s, Arquebuse, Hallebarde, Sabre, & Poignard were captured in 1940 following the Fall of France. All except Poignard were completed and entered service as "Patrol vessels" PA 1 to PA 4 (the latter saw no service). 
 HNLMS Gerard Callenburgh was scuttled to prevent her capture in 1940, but was nevertheless raised and commissioned into the Kriegsmarine as ZH1 in 1942.
  RHS Vasilefs Georgios was scuttled to prevent her captured in 1941, but was raised and commissioned into the Kriegsmarine as Hermes in 1942. 
 French Destroyer L'Opiniâtre was captured while still under construction.  Germany intended to completed her, but construction was halted in 1943 and broken up for scrap that year.
  and  light cruisers were captured in 1940 while still under construction. Renamed as KH1 and KH2 ("KH" means "Kreuzer Holland"), modified to fit an Atlantic Bow and redesigned for new German armament. Work was resume to be completed, but with very slow progress due to sabotage from the Dutch Resistance. KH1 was launched in 1944 to be use as blockship. Both ships were completed with a modernized post WW II design and commissioned into Dutch service in 1953.
 KB Dalmacija was a WW1 Imperial Germany light cruiser (SMS Niobe), sold to Yugoslavia in 1925 (KB Dalmacija), captured by Italy in 1941 (RN Cattaro), then by Germany following the Italian Armistice in 1943 and renamed Niobe. She was sunk by British torpedo boats.
 KB Dubrovnik was captured first by Italy in 1941 (RN Premuda), then by German following the Italian Armistice in 1943 (TA 32). She was scuttled in Genoa in 1945 following the Battle of the Ligurian Sea.
 KB Beograd was captured first by Italy in 1941 (RN Sebenico), then by German following the Italian Armistice in 1943 (TA 43). She was sunk in Trieste, though sources vary of how so.
 KB T3 was captured first by Italy, then by German following the Italian Armistice in 1943. She was sunk by Allied aircraft in February 1945.
 Four Yugoslav Orjen-class torpedo boat (KB Velebit, KB Dinara, KB Triglav and KB Rudnik) were captured first by Italy in 1941 (MS 42, MS 43, MS 44 and MS 46), then by German following the Italian Armistice in 1943 (S 601, S 602, S 603 and S 604). All four were scuttled in 1944.
 KB  was captured in 1941 and used as a troop transport until her sinking in 1944.
 Yugoslav minelayer D2 was captured first by Italy, then by German following the Italian Armistice in 1943. She was sunk in 1944.

Unfinished ships

Aircraft carriers
 Graf Zeppelin class
 , Laid down 1936, commissioned 1938 (85% complete at start of war, never completed)*
 Flugzeugträger B, Laid Down 1938, never launched, broken up 1940*

Heavy cruisers
 , (uncompleted, intended for conversion into light aircraft carrier, but never completed)
 , (sold uncompleted to Soviet Union in 1940)

Destroyers
 Zerstörer 1936C
 Zerstörer 1938A/Ac
 Zerstörer 1938B
 Zerstörer 1942: Z51 launched 1944, but bombed and never completed
 Zerstörer 1944
 Zerstörer 1945
 Spähkreuzer

Torpedo boats
 Flottentorpedoboot 1940 (Never completed)
 Flottentorpedoboot 1941 (Never completed)
 Flottentorpedoboot 1944 (Never completed)

A multitude of other ships also remained unfinished by the end of the war: escorts, gunboats, landing craft, fleet tenders, AA batteries, training ships, auxiliary ships, patrol boats, minelayers, mine hunters, fast torpedo attack boats (E-Boats) and more.

See also 
List of ships of the Second World War

References

 Janes Fighting Ships of World War Two. 1994 reprint of 1945/46 edition, Crescent Books, Random House, New York

Lists of ships of Germany
World War II naval ships of Germany